The Diocese of Gary is a Latin Church ecclesiastical territory, or diocese, of the Catholic Church in northwest Indiana in the United States. It was founded on December 17, 1956, by Pope Pius XII. 

The Diocese of Gary includes Lake, Porter, LaPorte,  and Starke counties in Indiana. The mother church is the Cathedral of the Holy Angels in Gary, Indiana. The Diocese of Gary is a suffragan diocese in the ecclesiastical province of the metropolitan Archdiocese of Indianapolis.

History

1675 to 1956 
During the 17th century, present day Indiana was part of the French colony of New France. The Diocese of Quebec, which had jurisdiction over the colony, sent French missionaries to the region. The first French Jesuit missionaries came to the Vincennes area around 1675.  Historical records show that a Father Mermet arrived in Vincennes around 1712, but the length of his visit is unknown. The oldest Catholic Church in  Vincennes is St. Francis Xavier. established around 1732.

After the British took control of New France in 1763, the Archdiocese of Quebec retained jurisdiction in the Indiana area. In 1776, the new United States claimed sovereignty over the area of Indiana. In 1787, Indiana became part of the Northwest Territory of the United States.

With the creation of the Diocese of Bardstown in Kentucky in 1810, supervision of the Indiana Territory shifted there. In 1827, the bishop of the Diocese of St. Louis assumed jurisdiction in the new state of Indiana. In 1834, Pope Gregory XVI erected the Diocese of Vincennes, which included both Indiana and Illinois. Pope Pius IX created the Diocese of Fort Wayne for Indiana only in 1857, including the Gary area.  Gary would remain part of this diocese for the next 100 years.

1956 to 2000 
During the first half of the 20th century, many Catholic immigrants arrived in Indiana from Eastern Europe and Mexico to work in the region's growing steel industry. The Vatican founded several native language parishes near the steel mills to accommodate these immigrants. 

In 1956, Pope Pius XII erected the Diocese of Gary, removing Lake, Porter, LaPorte,  and Starke Counties from the Diocese of Fort Wayne. He named Reverend Andrew Grutka of the Diocese of Fort Wayne as the first bishop of Gary.  Grutka selected Holy Angels church as his cathedral, renaming it as the Cathedral of the Holy Angels.  The new diocese had 129 active diocesan priests, 77 parishes, 60 parish schools and 135,485 Catholics, about 25 percent of the population of the four counties. Grutka retired in 1984. Grutka retired in 1984.

Pope John Paul II appointed Auxiliary Bishop Norbert Gaughan of the Diocese of Greensburg as the second bishop of Gary in 1984. During his tenure as bishop, Gaughan ordained ordained 13 priests for service to the diocese and started a diocesan newspaper, the Northwest Indiana Catholic. In 1986, he established the Catholic Services Appeal. Gaughan created the “We Can Change the Future” program for the creation of pastoral councils.  After Gaughan suffered a stroke, the pope named Auxiliary Bishop Dale Melczek of the Archdiocese of Detroit  in 1995 as coadjutor bishop to assist Gaughan. When Gaughan retired in 1996, Melczek automatically became bishop of Gary.

2000 to present 
In 2002,  Melczek published his first pastoral letter, “The Many Faces of Our Church:  a Pastoral Letter on Cultural Diversity” to discuss the contributions of different races and cultural groups to the Catholic church.  Melczek followed up the next year with the  pastoral letter “Created in God’s Image:  a Pastoral Letter on the Sin of Racism and a Call to Conversion.”

After Melczek retired in 2013, Pope Francis in 2014 appointed Gary Bishop Donald J. Hying of the Archdiocese of Milwaukee as the next bishop of Gary.  In 2016, Hying call the first synod in Gary with the publication of his pastoral letter, “Go, Therefore, and Make Disciples of All Nations” . He began an initiative in 2017 to focus on evangelization, vocations and other topics within the diocese.

In 2019, Pope Francis named Hying bishop of the Diocese of Madison. On November 26, 2019, Pope Francis appointed Reverend Robert McClory of the Archdiocese of Detroit to succeed Hying.McClory is the current bishop of the Diocese of Gary.

Sex Abuse 
In 2003, Bishop Melczek petitioned Cardinal Joseph Ratzinger in Rome to laicize Richard Emerson, a diocesan priest. Emerson first served in the Diocese of Gary starting in 1978, then moved in 1986 to the Diocese of Orlando as a temporary assignment close to his parents.  In 1991, Orlando Bishop Norbert Dorsey requested Emerson's transfer back to Gary, where Emerson resumed ministry.  Multiple allegations of inappropriate behavior were generated from Emerson's assignments in Florida and Indiana. 

On December 22, 2003, Melczek removed Monsignor Don Grass from ministry after he admitted sexually abusing a minor.  It happened while Grass was assigned to Cathedral of the Holy Angels Parish in Gary during the late 1960's.

On January 15, 2005, Melczek and the diocese were named in a lawsuit by an Orlando man. The plaintiff stated that Emerson had sexually abused him as a minor during the late 1980's and early 1990's when Emerson was posted at St. Charles Borromeo Parish in Orlando.  The lawsuit claimed that the diocese and Melczek ignored earlier sexual abuse allegations against Emerson during his first stay in Indiana. At his request, Emerson was removed from the priesthood in 2006. On July 7, 2010, Melczek and the diocese were sued again, based on allegations by a different man in Orlando against Emerson.

Diocese today
As of 2012, the Diocese of Gary had 105 priests, 67 permanent deacons, 10 religious brothers, and 85 religious sisters who are members of various religious institutes. The diocese had a Catholic population of 186,420 in 73 parishes and missions.As of 2012, four parishes in the diocese offered mass in Polish, two parishes in Croatian, one in Hungarian, and one in Lithuanian. Fourteen parishes offered Mass in Spanish.

The diocese has 17 elementary schools, three high schools, one college, and a Catholic student center at Valparaiso University.  The diocese also supervises six hospitals or medical centers, three homes for the aged, three protective homes, three cemeteries, and Catholic Charities, Diocese of Gary.

Bishops
 Andrew Gregory Grutka (Appointed bishop on December 29, 1956. Retired on July 9, 1984.  Grutka died on November 11, 1993.)
 Norbert Felix Gaughan (Appointed bishop July 9, 1984. Retired on June 1, 1996.  Gaughan died on October 1, 1999.)
 Dale Joseph Melczek (Appointed apostolic administrator on August 19, 1992 after Gaughan suffered a stroke, then coadjutor bishop on October 28, 1995. Succeeded as diocesan bishop on June 1, 1996. Retired on November 24, 2014.  Melczek died on August 25, 2022.)
 Donald J. Hying (Appointed on November 24, 2014.  He served until April 25, 2019, when he was appointed 5th Bishop of Diocese of Madison.)
 Robert John McClory (Appointed bishop on November 26, 2019. Installed on February 11, 2020.)

Other diocesan priest who became bishop
 Carl Frederick Mengeling, appointed fourth Bishop of Lansing (served as diocesan bishop from November 7, 1995 until his retirement on February 27, 2008).

Education
As of 2023, the superintendent of Catholic schools for the Diocese of Gary is Dr. Joseph Majchrowicz.

Elementary schools
The parishes run the following elementary and middle schools:

St. Patrick, Chesterton
St. Mary Catholic Community School, Crown Point
St. Stanislaus, East Chicago
St. Mary, Griffith
St. Casimir, Hammond
St. John Bosco, Hammond
Our Lady of Grace, Highland
Aquinas School at St. Andrew's, Merrillville
Notre Dame, Michigan City
Queen of All Saints, Michigan City
St. Stanislaus Kostka, Michigan City
St. Thomas More, Munster
Nativity of Our Savior, Portage
St. John the Evangelist, St. John
St. Michael, Schererville
St. Paul Catholic, Valparaiso
St. John the Baptist, Whiting

St. Catherine of Siena, a Catholic elementary school in Hammond, opened prior to 1949. Prior to 2009 its enrollment had declined, with 130 students that year, and its financial state had deteriorated. The school closed in 2009.

Secondary schools

Operated by Diocese
Bishop Noll Institute , Hammond
Andrean High School, Merrillville
Marquette Catholic High School, Michigan City

Independent
Sacred Heart Apostolic School, Rolling Prairie
La Lumiere School, La Porte

Colleges
Calumet College of St. Joseph, Whiting

Extraordinary Form
, the only mass in the Extraordinary Form of the Roman Rite in the diocese is offered at the Carmelite Shrine in Munster on Saturday evenings. It was established on Saturday, August 25, 1990, at the recommendation of Bishop Gaughan. The mass was featured in newspapers across the country when Summorum Pontificum was promulgated by Pope Benedict XVI.

Previously, a Traditional Latin Mass was available at St. Stanislaus in Michigan City on Sundays, but this Mass was discontinued when the celebrant died. St. Joseph the Worker in Gary had a monthly mass that was a hybrid of the Extraordinary and Ordinary Forms.

In 2015, the NWI Latin Mass Community was founded by laity to support and promote the Extraordinary Form in the Gary Diocese. On January 1, 2018, a Solemn High Mass was offered at the Cathedral of the Holy Angels by Bishop Joseph Perry, auxiliary bishop for the Archdiocese of Chicago.

In 2018, the Institute of Christ the King began an apostolate at St. Joseph parish in Hammond, offering the Extraordinary Form on a weekly basis. St. Joseph parish in Dyer also holds a monthly mass in the Extraordinary Form.

See also

 Catholic Church by country
 Catholic Church in the United States
 Ecclesiastical Province of Indianapolis
 Global organisation of the Catholic Church
 List of Roman Catholic archdioceses (by country and continent)
 List of Roman Catholic dioceses (alphabetical) (including archdioceses)
 List of Roman Catholic dioceses (structured view) (including archdioceses)
 List of the Catholic dioceses of the United States

References

External links 
Roman Catholic Diocese of Gary
 NWI Catholic (Diocese of Gary's weekly newspaper)
 NWI Latin Mass Community

 
Culture of Gary, Indiana
Christian organizations established in 1956
Roman Catholic Ecclesiastical Province of Indianapolis
Roman Catholic Dioceses in Indiana
Gary
Gary